is a private junior college in Yamagata, Yamagata, Japan. The predecessor of the school was founded in 1951. It was chartered as a junior women's college in 1966, and it became coeducational in 2001.

External links
 Official website 

Japanese junior colleges
Educational institutions established in 1966
Private universities and colleges in Japan
Universities and colleges in Yamagata Prefecture
1966 establishments in Japan